Roser Suñé Pascuet (born 26 August 1960) is an Andorran politician, current and first female to hold the office of General Syndic of the General Council, the Speaker of the Parliament of Andorra since 3 May 2019.

She was born in the old town of Andorra la Vella on 26 August 1960 and studied Education in 1980 and Catalan Philology at the University of Barcelona and graduated in 1983.

She had been Ambassador to Sweden between 1999 and 2005, to Norway and Iceland since 2000 to 2005. On 13 May 2011 she was named Minister of Education and Culture, until 7 April 2015, when was succeeded by Èric Jover.

References 

1960 births
Living people
Women legislative speakers
Democrats for Andorra politicians
Members of the General Council (Andorra)
University of Barcelona alumni
People from Andorra la Vella
Women government ministers of Andorra
Andorran women in politics
20th-century women politicians
General Syndics of the General Council (Andorra)
Andorran women ambassadors
Members of the General Council (Andorra) 2019-present